Vallehermoso can mean:

Vallehermoso, Negros Oriental, a municipality in the Philippines
Vallehermoso, Santa Cruz de Tenerife, a municipality on Canary Island
Vallehermoso (Madrid), a ward of Chamberi district, Madrid, Spain
Estadio de Vallehermoso, a multi-use stadium in Madrid, Spain
Torre PwC (formerly Torre Sacyr Vallehermoso), a skyscraper in Madrid, Spain
Sacyr Vallehermoso, a Spanish construction company

See also
Valle Hermoso (disambiguation)